Tyler Davis (born April 2, 1997) is an American football tight end for the Green Bay Packers of the National Football League (NFL). He played college football at UConn and Georgia Tech.

College career
Davis began his collegiate career at Connecticut. After his freshman season, he transitioned from quarterback to tight end. During three seasons, Davis made 15 starts and had 47 catches for 500 yards and seven touchdowns. In 2018 he tied for 2nd in single-season history at UConn with six touchdown catches for a tight end, as well as ranking first on the team in touchdown receptions, tenth in the American Athletic Conference among all players, and first among tight ends with 6 in 2018 for the Huskies. He went to Georgia Tech as a graduate transfer in 2019. Davis caught 17 passes for 148 yards and a touchdown in 12 games (11 starts) for the Yellow Jackets.

Professional career

Jacksonville Jaguars
Davis was selected in the sixth round of the 2020 NFL Draft with the 206th overall pick by the Jacksonville Jaguars.

On August 31, 2021, Davis was waived by the Jaguars.

Indianapolis Colts
On September 3, 2021, Davis was signed to the Indianapolis Colts practice squad.

Green Bay Packers
On September 28, 2021, Davis was signed to the Green Bay Packers active roster off the Colts practice squad.

On March 15, 2023, Davis re-signed with the Packers.

NFL career statistics

Regular season

Postseason

Personal life
Davis is the son of Steve and Cindy Davis and has three brothers, Bryan, Chenzo and Jake.

References

External links
Green Bay Packers bio
Georgia Tech Yellow Jackets bio

1997 births
Living people
American football tight ends
Georgia Tech Yellow Jackets football players
Green Bay Packers players
Indianapolis Colts players
Jacksonville Jaguars players
People from Bellmore, New York
Players of American football from New York (state)
Sportspeople from Nassau County, New York
UConn Huskies football players